Ardozyga megalommata is a species of moth in the family Gelechiidae. It was described by Edward Meyrick in 1904. It is found in Australia, where it has been recorded from Queensland.

The forewings are whitish, suffused with dark bronzy-fuscous irroration except on the veins and the costal edge. There are two transverse-oval dark fuscous blotches in the disc at one-third and two-thirds, outlined with whitish. The hindwings are grey.

References

Ardozyga
Moths described in 1904
Taxa named by Edward Meyrick
Moths of Australia